Corynomalus is a genus of handsome fungus beetles in the subfamily Lycoperdininae.

References

External links 

 

Coccinelloidea genera
Endomychidae